Mishan-e Sofla (also Romanized as Mīshān-e Soflá; also known as Mishan and Mīshān-e Kūchek) is a village in Mishan Rural District, Mahvarmilani District, Mamasani County, Fars Province, Iran. At the 2006 census, its population was 327, in 75 families.

References 

Populated places in Mamasani County